Elections to East Renfrewshire Council were held on 3 May 2007 the same day as the other Scottish local government elections and the Scottish Parliament general election.

The election was the first using six new wards created as a result of the Local Governance (Scotland) Act 2004.  Each ward elected three or four councillors using the single transferable vote system of proportional representation. The new wards replaced 20 single-member wards which used the plurality (first past the post) system of election.

Election results

Ward results

Neilston, Uplawmoor and Newton Mearns North (4 seats)

Barrhead (4 seats)

Giffnock and Thornliebank (3 seats)

Netherlee, Stamperland and Williamwood (3 seats)

Newton Mearns South (3 seats)

Busby, Clarkston and Eaglesham (3 seats)

References

2007 Scottish local elections
2007